Tadahiko Taira
  Kunimitsu Takahashi
  Yuki Takahashi
  Gábor Talmácsi
  Makoto Tamada
  Roberto Tamburini
  Teisuke Tanaka
  Naomi Taniguchi
  Davide Tardozzi
  Luigi Taveri
  Omobono Tenni
  Nicolás Terol
  Rudi Thalhammer
  Arturo Tizón
  Aalt Toersen
  Masaki Tokudome
  Shoya Tomizawa
  Ricardo Tormo
  Armando Torocco
  Ramón Torras
  Herri Torrontegui
  Imre Tóth
  Jean-Louis Tournadre
  Takeshi Tsujimura
  Mateo Túnez
  Keith Turner

 T